The civil conflict in the Philippines as of February 2019, consists of an insurgency pitting government forces against Maoist rebels, that began in 1969 during the rule of Ferdinand Marcos.

the communist rebellion in the Philippines
the Moro conflict (until February 2019)

Clashes between communists and the Philippine government

List of clashes between the military, MNLF, and MILF 
 February 2000 Operation Valiancy
 March 2000 Operation Audacity
 July 2000 Battle of Camp Abubakar
 November 2001 2001 Misuari rebellion
 February 2003 Battle of the Buliok Complex
 July 2007 Basilan beheading incident
 August 2008 North Cotabato conflict
 September 2013 Zamboanga City crisis

List of clashes between the military and Jihadist groups 
 June 2001 Siege of Lamitan 
 January 2014 Operation Darkhorse
 April 2014 Battle of Basilan
 January 2015 Mamasapano clash
 February 2016 Butig clash
 April 2016 Battle of Tipo-Tipo
 Summer 2016 Sulu and Basilan Clashes
 November 2016 Butig clash
 January 2017 Kidapawan jail siege
 May 2017 Bohol clashes
 May 2017 Battle of Marawi

Casualties by year

Extreme Islamists versus the government

Note: Some casualties from small-scale conflicts are not given.

References

20th-century conflicts
21st-century conflicts
Insurgencies in Asia
Military history of the Philippines
History of the Philippines (1965–1986)
History of the Philippines (1986–present)

Rebellions in the Philippines
Wars involving the Philippines
Proxy wars